The Mendelssohn Scholarship refers to two scholarships awarded in Germany and in the United Kingdom. Both commemorate the composer Felix Mendelssohn, and are awarded to promising young musicians to enable them to continue their development.

History
Shortly after Mendelssohn's death in 1847, a group of his friends and admirers formed a committee in London to establish a scholarship to enable musicians to study at the Leipzig Conservatoire, which Mendelssohn had founded in 1843. Their fundraising included a performance of Mendelssohn's Elijah in 1848, featuring Jenny Lind. The link between London and Leipzig fell through, resulting in two Mendelssohn Scholarships.

Mendelssohn Scholarship in Germany
In Germany, the Mendelssohn Scholarship was established in the 1870s as two awards of 1500 Marks, one for composition and one for performance, for any student of a music school in Germany, and was funded by the Prussian state as part of an arrangement under which the Mendelssohn family donated the composer's manuscripts to the state. The first recipient was the composer, Engelbert Humperdinck, who used it to travel to Italy in 1879.

Funded by the Jewish Mendelssohn family, the award was discontinued by the Nazis in 1934. It was revived by the Ministry of Culture of the former East Germany in 1963, in the form of two annual prizes for composition and for performance. It is now awarded by the Prussian Cultural Heritage Foundation.

Recipients

As well as Humperdinck, famous recipients include the pianist Wilhelm Kempff and the composer Kurt Weill.

The following is an incomplete chronological list of recipients of the German Mendelssohn Scholarship.

1879 to 1934
 1879 – Engelbert Humperdinck, Josef Kotek, Johann Kruse, Ernst Seyffardt
 1880 – Marie Soldat, Carl Wolf (composition)
 1881 – Bernhard Stavenhagen, Andreas Moser, Johann Kruse, Ethel Smyth, Philipp Wolfrum, Adam Alex, Sophie Braun, Fritz Kaufmann (composition), Gotthold Knauth (piano), Alfred Sormann (piano)
 1882 – Marie Soldat (violin), Martin Gebhardt (organ), Elsa Harriers (voice), Marie Harzer (voice), Karl Prill (violin), Arnold Mendelssohn (composition), Carl Schneider (composition)
 1883 – Alex Adam, Albert Gorter (composition), Marie Harzer (voice), Hedwig Meyer (piano), Martha Schwieder (piano), Ernst Seyffardt (composition), Georg Stoltzenberg (composition), Elise Tannenberg (piano), Gabriele Wietrowetz (violin), Margarethe Witt (violin)
 1884 – Carl Grothe (composition), Anna Haasters (piano), Solma Krause (piano), Max Puchat (composition), Carl Schneider (composition)
 1885 – Gabriele Wietrowetz, Ida Beckmann (violin), Marie Mette (voice), Fanny Richter (piano), Georg Stoltzenberg (composition), Margarete Will (piano)
 1886 – Charles Gregorowitsch (violin; also 1887, 1888), Hermann Kindler (cello), Geraldine Morgan (violin; also 1887), Bernhard Pfannstiel (organ; also 1887, 1888), Olga von Radecke (piano)
 1887 – Waldemar von Baußnern, Heinrich van Eyken, Peter Fassbänder, Felix Odenwald
 1888 – Fanny Richter (piano), Percy Sherwood (piano; also 1889), Eduard Behm (also 1890, 1891), Mathieu Neumann, Ewald Strasser, Lucy Campbell (cello; also 1890)
 1890 – Bram Eldering, Carl Markees (violin), Hermann von Roner (violin), Elisabeth Rouge (piano), August Schmidt (piano) E. van Dooren (also 1892), Martin Grabert, Friedrich Koch, Max Oppitz (clarinet), Carl Piening (cello)
 1891 – Rudolf Lentz (violin; also 1892, 1893), Mina Rode (violin; also 1894), Betty Schwabe (violin), Felice Kirchdorffer (piano)
 1892 – Helene Jordan (voice), Rosa Schindler (violin), Lina Mayer (piano)
 1893 – Carl Thiel, Leo Schrattenholz, Louis Saar, Nellie Kühler (piano), Amelia Heineberg (piano), Olga von Lerdahely (violin), Kati Macdonald (piano), Lizzie Reynolds (piano)
 1894 – Heinrich Bendler (piano), Dietrich Schäfer (piano), Toni Tholfus (piano), May C. Taylor (composition)
 1895 – Elsie Stanley Hall,  
 1896 – Paul Juon, Walter Bachmann (piano), Juanita Brockmann (violin; also 1899, 1904)
 1889 – Percy Sherwood
 1900 – Karl Klingler
 1901 – Elly Ney
 1902 – Alfred Sittard
 1902 – Ignatz Waghalter
 1904 – Eugenie Stoltz (honorable mention)
 1904 – Mae Doelling (1888–1965), piano
 1905 – Eugenie Stoltz 
 1906 – Sara Gurowitsch
 1909 – Samuel Lieberson
 1910 & 1913 – Ernst Toch
 1912 – Licco Amar
 1913 – Hans Bassermann, Mischa Levitzki, Max Trapp
 1913 & 1918 – Erwin Schulhoff
 1915 – 
 1917 – Wilhelm Kempff, Emil Peeters
 1918 – Pancho Vladigerov
 1919 – Kurt Weill
 1920 – Pancho Vladigerov
 1925 – Berthold Goldschmidt, Max Rostal
 1926 – Ignace Strasfogel, Ernst Pepping
 1928 – Hans Humpert
 1928 – Grete von Zieritz
 1928 – Wilhelm Stross
 1929 – Herbert Marx
 1930 – Ludwig Hölscher
 1931 – Kurt Fiebig, Roman Totenberg, Artur Balsam
 1932 – Norbert von Hannenheim, Harald Genzmer
 1933 – Werner Trenkner, Bernhard Heiden, Karlrobert Kreiten
 1935 – Fritz Werner, Johannes Schneider-Marfels

Since 1963
 1965 – Peter Herrmann
 1966 – Walter Steffens
 1974/75 – Gabriele Kupfernagel
 1976/77 – Reinhard Wolschina
 1978/80 – Walter Thomas Heyn
 1981 – Bernd Franke
 1985 – Rolf Fischer
 1987 – Olaf Henzold
 1988 – Steffen Schleiermacher
 1988/89 – Caspar René Hirschfeld
 Carola Nasdala
 Michael Schönheit
 Michael Stöckigt
 Matthias Henneberg

Mendelssohn Scholarship in the United Kingdom

The funds raised at the 1848 concert were invested and allowed to accumulate until 1856, when Arthur Sullivan was elected as the first scholar. Since then it has been awarded from time to time, administered by the Mendelssohn Scholarship Foundation, which is linked to the Royal Academy of Music. The foundation was created by a trust deed in 1871. Its trustees include the composers Anthony Payne and Justin Connolly, and the principal of the Royal Academy of Music, Jonathan Freeman-Attwood; and its charitable objects are "For the education of musical students of both sexes in pursuance of the intentions of the founders".

Recipients
Recipients include the composers Frederick Corder, George Dyson, Malcolm Arnold and Kenneth Leighton.

The following is an incomplete chronological list of recipients of the British Mendelssohn Scholarship.
1856 – Arthur Sullivan
1865 – Charles Swinnerton Heap
1871 – William Shakespeare
1873 – Eaton Faning
1875 – Frederick Corder
1879 – Maude Valérie White
1881 – Eugen d'Albert
1884 – Marie Wurm
1890 – S P Waddington
1895 - Christopher Wilson
1899 – Percy Hilder Miles
1905 – George Dyson
1909 – Eric William Gritton
1912 – Joseph Alan Taffs
1916 – Philip Levi
1921 – Arthur Lawrence Sandford
1923 – Percy Purvis Turnbull
1927 – Godfrey Sampson
1929 – David Moule-Evans
1932 – Clifton Ivor Walsworth
1935 – Daniel Jones
1948 – Malcolm Arnold
1951 – Kenneth Leighton
1954 – Francis Burt
1956 – John Exton
1960 – David Blake
1962 – Richard Stoker
1964 – Patric Standford
1968 – Brian Ferneyhough
1969 – Jonathan Lloyd
1972 – Nicola LeFanu
1974 – Richard Blackford
1979 – Lionel Sainsbury
1985 – James Harley
1986 – Javier Alvarez
1988 – Martin Butler
1997 – Richard Causton
2000 – Luke Bedford
2002 – Cheryl Frances-Hoad
2004 – Oliver Searle
2006 – Nadja Plein
2008 – Steven Daverson
2010 – Samuel Bordoli
2012 – Christian Mason
2014 – Arne Gieshoff
2016 – Nicholas Moroz
2018 – Nicholas Morrish
2019 – Angela Slater
2022 – Hugo Bell

References

External links
 of the UK Mendelssohn Scholarship Foundation

British music awards
East German awards
German music awards
Classical music awards
Felix Mendelssohn
University of Music and Theatre Leipzig
Royal Academy of Music
Scholarships in the United Kingdom
Scholarships in Germany